←2011 - 2012 - 2013→

This is a list of Japanese television dramas shown within Japan during the year of 2012.

Winter

Spring

Specials

Summer

Autumn

References

2012 Japanese television dramas
Dramas